The Institute for Free Speech (IFS), formerly called the Center for Competitive Politics, is a 501(c)(3) non-profit organization formerly headquartered in Alexandria, Virginia, and now in Washington, D.C. IFS' mission is to "promote and defend the First Amendment rights to freely speak, assemble, publish, and petition the government through strategic litigation, communication, activism, training, research, and education."

History
The Center for Competitive Politics was founded in 2005 by former Federal Election Commission Chairman Bradley A. Smith. Smith founded the organization with the goal of "challenging the current campaign finance system in both federal court and the court of public opinion." In October 2017, the organization changed its name to the Institute for Free Speech.

Activities
The Institute for Free Speech has been particularly active in criticizing campaign finance regulations, taxpayer-financed political campaigns, and restrictions on referendums and ballot initiatives. The organization publishes various studies and reports on campaign finance and political speech matters, and provides pro bono legal counsel to parties in suits challenging the constitutionality of campaign finance statutes. It has also defended the right of independent groups to participate freely in the electoral process.

The organization represented the plaintiffs in SpeechNow.org v. Federal Election Commission, the Court of Appeals decision that authorized the creation of Super PACs.

In 2014, the Institute challenged California's requirement that nonprofit groups must turn over their donor lists to the state in order to receive a license to solicit contributions from residents of the state.

The organization has stated its opposition to a proposed constitutional amendment that would give Congress more power to regulate political spending. It has also opposed proposed Internal Revenue Service guidelines that would redefine tax rules for social welfare organizations that engage in political advocacy as a secondary activity.

References

External links
  
 Organizational Profile – National Center for Charitable Statistics (Urban Institute)

Non-profit organizations based in Alexandria, Virginia
Charities based in Virginia
2005 establishments in Virginia